Countdown is a 1967 science fiction film directed by Robert Altman, based on the 1964 novel The Pilgrim Project by Hank Searls. Made before M*A*S*H, the film was subject to re-editing by the studio. Countdown stars James Caan and Robert Duvall as astronauts vying to be the first American to walk on the Moon as part of a crash program to beat the Soviet Union.

Plot
In the late 1960s, astronauts training in an Apollo simulator have their session ended early. They grumble about it, but their commander, Chiz (Robert Duvall), knows the reason for the abort: the Pilgrim Program. The Russians will be sending a Moon landing mission up in four weeks. The Americans had a secret alternate plan to the Apollo program, the fictional program Pilgrim, in case this happened. One astronaut would be sent to the Moon in a one-way rocket (depicted in the film as a Titan II), using a modified Project Gemini craft. He would stay on the Moon for a few months in a shelter pod launched and landed before him. Later, astronauts from an Apollo mission would come to retrieve him.

The equipment is ready, but the Russians complicate matters by sending up a civilian. Chiz, although trained and qualified, is an Air Force colonel. NASA and the White House insist that an American civilian be their first man on the Moon. Lee (James Caan), one of Chiz's crew, is tapped. Chiz is outraged, but agrees to train Lee in the few days they have. Chiz pushes Lee's training hard, half to get him ready, half hoping he will drop out and Chiz can step in. Lee persists, driven by the same astronaut dream.

After a press leak about Pilgrim, the Russians launch a week early. Deflated at not being first, everyone carries on. The shelter pod (a LEM lander) is launched and landed successfully. Lee is launched on schedule. He encounters a power drain malfunction en route which tests his character and hinders radio contact. The Russians have also lost contact with their team. As Lee orbits the Moon, he does not see the beacon of the shelter. With only seconds left before he must abort and return to Earth, he lies about seeing it. Mission Control okays his retro burn and he lands. Now all radio contact is lost. Lee gets out of the Gemini lander and walks around with one hour of oxygen in his suit. He finds the crashed Russian lander on its side, the three dead cosmonauts sprawled around it.

Everyone on Earth is nervously awaiting news, but none comes. Lee takes the Soviet flag from a dead cosmonaut and lays it on a nearby rock with his own American flag. With little air left and nowhere to go, Lee spins the toy mouse his son gave him. It points right, so he walks in that direction. People on Earth are losing hope as his time has run out. Lee looks at his watch to see that he has just minutes of air left. A red glow on his arm catches his attention. It is the locator beacon atop the shelter. Lee is last seen walking towards the shelter... towards survival.

Cast 

 James Caan as Lee Stegler
 Joanna Moore as Mickey Stegler
 Robert Duvall as Charles "Chiz" Stewart
 Barbara Baxley as Jean
 Charles Aidman as Gus
 Steve Ihnat as Ross Duellan
 Michael Murphy as Rick
 Ted Knight as Walter Larson
 Stephen Coit as Ehrman
 John Rayner as Dunc
 Charles Irving as Seidel
 Bobby Riha as Stevie Stegler

Production 
Under the working title of Moonshot, production on Countdown benefited from the cooperation of NASA, lending facilities at  Cocoa Beach, Florida, to enhance the production.

Altman's dismissal 

Altman was fired as director of the film for delivering footage that featured actors talking over each other, it was so unusual for that time that studio executives considered it incompetence rather than an attempt to make scenes more realistic. He had finished filming and was preparing to begin the editing process when he received a call from Bill Conrad, then executive producer at Warner Brothers: "He told me, 'Don't come to the studio, they won't let you through the gates' I said, 'What do you mean?' 'Well, Jack Warner saw your dailies and he said, 'That fool has actors talking at the same time.' And I had to drive up to the gate, and there was a cardboard box with all this stuff from my desk, which the guard handed to me. I was not allowed in the studio. And they cut the picture for kids."As a result of Altman's dismissal, the film's ending was changed. "I left it ambiguous--the guy was probably going to die on the moon...He goes off in one direction, and the camera pans back and reveals the beacon is in the opposite direction. That was how I ended it."

Overlapping dialogue went on to be a signature of Altman's style. In the documentary Altman, the director explains that he was "just trying to get the illusion of reality"

Reception 
Critics were harsh with the unrealistic presentation of a rushed moon landing by an inexperienced astronaut. In a May 1968 review of Countdown for The New York Times, critic Howard Thompson calls the film a "limp space-flight drama" which "makes the moon seem just as dull as Mother Earth". A February 1985 review in Malaysia's New Straits Times calls Countdown "dated" and complains that the characters have "no depth or direction". Filmink called it "an interesting, dated-really-quickly astronaut drama."

In Visions of the future, relics of the past, a June 1995 story in The New York Times, dealing with the history of spaceflight movies, Thomas Mallon appreciates that the film "highlights the space program's early can-do ethos". He also calls Countdown, a "little movie" with "few touches of Mr. Altman's later cynical wit" and "somehow not terribly suspenseful".

See also 
 List of American films of 1968

 Apollo 18, a 2011 horror film of a secret lunar mission
 Apollo 13, a 1995 film dramatizing the Apollo 13 incident
 Gravity, a 2013 3D science-fiction space drama film
 List of films featuring space stations
 Love, a 2011 film about being stranded in space
 Marooned, a 1969 film adaptation of a Martin Caidin novel of the same name about an Apollo/Skylab-type mission crew stranded in space after a hardware failure which in some ways anticipated the Apollo 13 incident.
 Survival film, about the film genre, with a list of related films

References

Notes

Citations

Bibliography 

 Maltin, Leonard. Leonard Maltin's Movie Guide 2013. New York: New American Library, 2012 (originally published as TV Movies, then Leonard Maltin’s Movie & Video Guide), First edition 1969, published annually since 1988. .
 Pym, John, ed. Time Out Film Guide. London: Time Out Guides Limited, 2004. .

External links 
 
 
 
 
 

1968 films
1960s science fiction thriller films
American science fiction thriller films
American space adventure films
Cold War films
1960s English-language films
Films about astronauts
Films adapted into comics
Films based on American novels
Films based on science fiction novels
Films directed by Robert Altman
Films scored by Leonard Rosenman
Films set in the 1960s
Films shot in Florida
Hard science fiction films
Moon in film
Warner Bros. films
1960s American films